Tom Ibarra (born 3 October 1999 in Hyères Les Palmiers near Saint-Tropez) is a French jazz guitarist and composer.

Biography 
Ibarra picked up the guitar when he was 6 years of age and is autodidact. He started composing at the age of 11.
 
In 2013 and 2014 he won the 1st prize young talent SACEM. He played alone with his guitar and backing tracks he had composed.
Prix SACEM 2013 Prix SACEM Jeune Talent - Mona - Juin 2014  Prix SACEM Jeune Talent - Rocket - Juin 2014.
 
At the same time he played with the great Didier Lockwood, Lionel Suarez, Eddie Constantine and Sylvain Luc. Didier Lockwood, Sylvain Luc, Lionel Suarez, Eddie Constantine feat. Tom Ibarra on Nuages (Django Reinhardt) - June 2014 Didier Lockwood, Sylvain Luc, Lionel Suarez, Eddie Constantine feat. Tom Ibarra on Minor Swing - June 2014

In 2016 he won the Young Hope Action Jazz at the "Springboard Action Jazz" with his band. The same year he was invited on stage at the Saint Emilion Jazz Festival by Marcus Miller.

In 2017 he won the famous LetterOne Rising Stars Jazz Award.

In 2018 Tom Ibarra shared the stage again with Marcus Miller and his band in June at Leopolis Jazz Festival (Ukraine) Marcus Miller feat. Tom Ibarra @ Leopolis Jazz festival Ukraine 2018, then in July at Jazzopen in Stuttgart (Germany) Marcus Miller feat. Tom Ibarra @ Jazzopen Stuttgart 2018.

He has also composed pieces of music that he proposed to great international musicians, such as Gergő Borlai, Federico Malaman, Igor Falecki or Etibar Asadli. Tom Ibarra feat. Gergő Borlai & Federico Malaman on Borderless Fusion - April 2017 Tom Ibarra feat. Antoine Vidal, Etibar Asadli & Igor Falecki on Creative Way - June 2018

After his bachelor he has studied at CMDL from 2016 to 2018 (Centre des Musiques Didier Lockwood) Centre des Musiques Didier Lockwood

Honors 
 2013-2014: Prix SACEM du Festival Jazz Musette des Puces de Saint-Ouen
 2015: Prix spécial du Jury Festival Jazz Au Phare
 2016: Jeune Espoir Action Jazz lors at "Tremplin Action Jazz"
 2017: Multi prix Festival des Rives et des Notes Oloron-Sainte-Marie
 2017: LetterOne Rising Stars Jazz Award

Discography 
 2015: 15 (Tom Ibarra)
 2018: Sparkling (Tom Ibarra) with Michael League as guest on Sparkling, and Stéphane Guillaume as guest on Aurore.
 2021: LUMA (Tom Ibarra)

References

External links 
 

French jazz guitarists
French jazz composers
Male jazz composers
1999 births
Living people
21st-century guitarists
21st-century French male musicians
French male guitarists